Michael Bearpark is an English scientist and musician.

Work as scientist
Bearpark is a Principal Research Fellow in the Chemistry Department at Imperial College London. He works in computational chemistry, including method and software development with applications to modeling the excited electronic states of large molecules and their photochemical reaction dynamics, as well as research into the coherent control of chemical reactions. He has also contributed to the development of the Gaussian computational chemistry codes.

Work as musician
Mostly known as an electric textural guitarist and loop musician, Bearpark plays a central role in the band Darkroom. He also has an ongoing duo project with German loop guitarist Bernhard Wagner, called Pedaltone.

Bearpark was a member of the live No-Man band for the band's mini-tour of Europe in autumn 2008 (playing guitar alongside Steven Wilson). He has played on two No-Man releases - as a guest on the 2003 album Together We're Stranger and as a live band member on the 2010 Mixtaped concert DVD.

Bearpark has also been a frequent collaborator with No-Man singer Tim Bowness. He has played alongside Bowness in the 1980s North West-based art-rock bands After The Stranger and Plenty, the ambient-folk band Samuel Smiles (founded by Bearpark himself) and the contemporary progressive rock band Henry Fool (both of the latter projects also featuring multi-instrumentalist Peter Chilvers). In turn, Bowness has been an occasional Darkroom member.

Bearpark's other collaborations include work with Richard Barbieri (of Japan and Porcupine Tree) and David Kosten's Faultline. He is a regular contributor to Improvizone, a regular London-based night of improvised instrumental music organised by drummer Andrew Booker.

Most recently, Bearpark has formed a more straightforward rock band called Aimless Mules, which also features Andrew Booker (drums), Chris Wild (vocals), Nic Regan (bass) and Charles Fernyhough (guitar). Additionally, Bearpark is currently a member of the space rock band Hawkflawed, formed with musician Ghost of Wood and drummer/vocalist Simon Hill.

Selected discography as musician
as group member:
Darkroom, Carpetworld EP (3rd Stone Ltd., 1998)
Darkroom, Daylight (3rd Stone Ltd., 1998)
Tim Bowness/Samuel Smiles, World Of Bright Futures (Hidden Art, 1999)
Darkroom, Seethrough (peoplesound.com, 1999 - re-issued on Burning Shed, 2003)
Tim Bowness/Samuel Smiles, How We Used To Live (Hidden Art, 2000)
Tim Bowness/Samuel Smiles, Live Archive One (Hidden Art, 2001)
Tim Bowness/Samuel Smiles, Live Archive Two (Hidden Art, 2001)
Darkroom, Fallout One (Burning Shed, 2001)
Darkroom, Fallout Two (Burning Shed, 2001)
Darkroom, Fallout Three (Burning Shed, 2002)
Darkroom, Freefall (Burning Shed, 2002)
Darkroom, The DAC Mixes (Burning Shed, 2002)
Pedaltone, Pedaltone (Burning Shed, 2006)
Ghost of Wood & Michael Bearpark, Ursa (Curated Doom, 2018)

as guest musician:
Richard Barbieri/Tim Bowness, Flame (One Little Indian, 1994)
Faultline, Faultline EP (Fused & Bruised, 1998)
Faultline, Mute EP (Leaf, 1998)
Faultline, Closer, Colder (Leaf, 1999)
No-Man, Together We're Stranger (KScope/Snapper Music, 2003)
No-Man, Wherever There Is Light EP  (KScope/Snapper Music, 2009)
No-Man, Mixtaped live DVD (KScope/Snapper Music, 2010)

References

External links
Michael Bearpark's page in the academic listings at Imperial College, London
Darkroom homepage
Interview with Michael Bearpark in Guitar Player magazine

Living people
English scientists
English chemists
English rock guitarists
English male guitarists
Avant-garde guitarists
English experimental musicians
Free improvisation
Academics of Imperial College London
English computer scientists
Year of birth missing (living people)
Place of birth missing (living people)
Computational chemists